Kings Heath Stadium was a greyhound racing track in Birmingham.

Origins and Opening
In 1927 the British Greyhound Sports Club (BGSC) acquired the lease of the newly constructed stadium on the south side of Taylor Road and which was accessed off the east side of Alcester Road South. The land on which the stadium was constructed was formerly known as the Horse Show Ground. The first race meeting was on 21 May 1927. The company also owned four other tracks in 1927, Darnall Stadium in Sheffield, Knowle Stadium in Bristol, Boulevard Stadium in Hull and St Annes in Blackpool. The new facilities included a main grandstand with a capacity of 3,000 and a concrete slope in front of the grandstand that could accommodate a further 2,000 people. The stadium capacity was estimated to be around 20,000 and the new build was overseen by Mr J. P. Hughes of the BGSC.

History

Towards the end of 1927 greyhound racing was successful and a new company called the Associated Greyhound Racecourses Limited was formed and they purchased eight tracks including the five BGSC tracks and the Kings Heath lease.

On 7 October 1935, an 18 year lease was acquired by Herbert Leo Craven (the Managing Director of the Long Eaton and Perry Barr stadiums at the time) and he introduced a major new event called the Lincoln. The first running of the Lincoln was won by Slightly Polly trained by Arthur Doc Callanan. In 1949 the freehold was finally bought outright by the Kings Heath Racecourse Ltd. The track was described as a fair sized course with fairly easy turns and a good length run in despite the circuit having a small 390 yard circumference. The main distances were 480 and 675 yards and greyhounds chased an ‘Outside Sumner’ hare. On the Alcester Road South entrance there was the main stand featuring the Silver Club and Best Ring Club with matching betting rings. On the opposite side of the course were two covered stands, to the west was the popular betting ring and to the east were the racing kennels, isolation kennels and home kennels that included a rest room and surgery. Rest kennels were located at Cookhill in Worcestershire. Perspective owners had to pay kennel charges of one guinea per week and the greyhound would be accepted into the track kennels on the understanding that all greyhounds were subject to veterinary examination, National Greyhound Racing Club rules and company conditions.

The first track trained success came in 1948 when King Hero trained by P.E Frost won the Cambridgeshire at West Ham Stadium. Another race called the Midland Oaks was introduced and trainers included Jim Todd, Bill Bryant, Alf Gibbins, Len Bane and Mr Allen.

Following the 1964 closure of the Lythalls Lane Stadium in Coventry, a major race the prestigious Eclipse Stakes was transferred to the track. Following the formation of the Bookmakers Afternoon Greyhound Service (BAGS) in 1967 the track was chosen as one of the first four tracks to host live betting shop race meetings along with Oxford, Park Royal and Stamford Bridge.

Closure
In 1971 developers bought the stadium from the Greyhound Racing Association who themselves had only purchased the stadium the previous year. The final race meeting was held on 31 March 1971. The last race is won by Zansy Token. The north part of the stadium is now Wynfield and Leander Gardens and the south part is where the Cocks Moors Woods golf course stands.

Competitions

The Lincoln

1936-1970 (480 yards), 1940-1951 (not held)

Track records

References

Defunct greyhound racing venues in the United Kingdom
Defunct sports venues in the West Midlands (county)
Sport in Birmingham, West Midlands
Sports venues completed in 1927